The Grand parc de Miribel-Jonage is an urban park covering almost 2,200 hectares on the outskirts of Lyon. It covers most of the Island of Miribel-Jonage on the Rhône. This island was created in the 19th century with the digging of the Miribel and Jonage canals to help control the flooding of the Rhône.

The park is a recreational area for the inhabitants of Greater Lyon, and also includes wildlife protection zones for fauna and flora. The park provides two other functions: to be the backup drinking water resource of Lyon, and it provides a buffer flood zone in case of the Rhône flooding.

See also
Parc de Gerland
Parc de Parilly
Parc de la Tête d'Or
Parks in Lyon

References

Parks in Lyon